Berke family was an old Hungarian noble family in the Slovene March (Vas County, nowadays: Prekmurje, Slovenia). They were landowners and bankers. 

On 10 December 1609 Ambrosius Berke was elevated into nobility, however older documents shows that this might be only a confirmation of nobility, because in years 1417 and 1427 we can find mentions of Péter de Berke and Jakab Berke, who were homo regius (királyi ember). In 1610 the family was written into Vas County noble register. In 1690 king Leopold I donated the place of Nagybarkóc to Péter Berke.
At the end of the 19th century they have established a bank in Vas County. Balaž Berke, Ferenc Berke and János Berke, members of the Berke family were Slovenian writers (they wrote in Vend dialect). József Berke was also a member of Hungarian parliament from 1869–1872, then Count Szapáry has won the elections. But 3 years later Berke has won again 1875–1878 and 1878–1881.

Hungarian families
Prekmurje Slovenes
Hungarian nobility